Sailor Moon, originally released in Japan as , and later as Pretty Guardian Sailor Moon, is an anime series adapted from the manga series of the same name written and illustrated by Naoko Takeuchi. The series was directed by Junichi Sato, Kunihiko Ikuhara and Takuya Igarashi and produced by TV Asahi and Toei Animation. The first four seasons were dubbed and released in North America by DIC Entertainment (now WildBrain) and Cloverway. The series concentrates on the adventures of Usagi Tsukino, a schoolgirl who learns that she and several other girls can transform into superheroines, the Sailor Guardians, and fight against evil forces that threaten the world: the Dark Kingdom, the Makaiju, the Black Moon Clan, the Death Busters, the Dead Moon Circus, and Shadow Galactica.

The series aired from March 7, 1992 to February 8, 1997, on TV Asahi in Japan. In addition to the 200 episodes, three feature-length films were produced, as well as five short films. In North America, the episodes aired from August 28, 1995 to December 21, 2000, on YTV in Canada, and in first-run syndication (and later on Cartoon Network) in the United States.

The first two seasons of the series, Sailor Moon and Sailor Moon R, were sold across 20 VHS volumes in Japan in 1995, and by the end of that year, each volume had sold more than 300,000 copies. In 2001, ADV Films released the English dubs of the first two seasons to 20 VHS volumes. The first two English-language seasons were released on 14 Region 1 DVDs in 2002 by ADV. ADV also released subtitled and uncensored and uncut versions of the first two seasons in two separate Limited Edition DVD box sets in 2003. Pioneer Entertainment released both edited and unedited versions of the third and fourth seasons, Sailor Moon S and Sailor Moon Super S respectively, on DVD and VHS in 2001 and 2002. In 2004, the international rights to the series expired.

At the start of Sailor Moon S, the episode numbers for the dub were adjusted by YTV to match those of the original Japanese version. There had previously been a gap in numbering because of the seven episodes that had been cut or merged in the previous two seasons. Because of this, episode numbers 83-89 were never used for the dub. However, in the United States, 83-89 were used for the dub on Cartoon Network, and did not match those of the original Japanese version.

On May 16, 2014, the entire anime series (all 200 TV episodes, all three movies, and the TV specials) was re-licensed for an updated English-language release by Viz Media.

Series overview

Episode list

Season 1 (1992–93)

Season 2: R (1993–94)

Season 3: S (1994–95)

Season 4: SuperS (1995–96)

Season 5: Sailor Stars (1996–97)

Specials

Short anime specials
Two short episodes were created to be shown with the first and  third theatrical films of the Sailor Moon anime. The first, entitled "Make Up! Sailor Guardians", is a comical introduction to the cast of the series for those not familiar with the franchise, while the second, "Ami's First Love", is an adaptation of an extra story (omake) from the Sailor Moon manga.

In 2014, Viz Media licensed the shorts for an English language release in North America.

Sailor Moon SuperS special

The latter three specials, collectively called the "SuperS Specials", were released together, airing in lieu of a regular episode near the beginning of the SuperS season. The first special, "An Elegant Metamorphosis? Crybaby Usagi's Growth Diary", is a summary of the first three seasons of the Sailor Moon series. The second special, "Haruka and Michiru, Again! The Ghostly Puppet Show", features Haruka and Michiru in a luxury hotel on a cliff. In the third special, "Chibiusa's Adventure! The Dreaded Vampire Castle", Chibiusa uncovers one of her classmates as a monster and fights it with the other Sailor Guardians.

Films

References

Sailor Moon
Episodes